Merchistonian Football Club is a rugby football team based in Edinburgh, Scotland. It was for former pupils of Merchiston Castle School.

History

Merchistonian was a founding member of the Scottish Rugby Union and one of the five Scottish clubs to issue the challenge to English football players that resulted in the first rugby international.  The club supplied three players for the match Andrew Galbraith Colville, George Ritchie and the scorer of the match's only goal (conversion) William Cross.  Cross also scored one of Scotland's two tries to England's one however, at the time, tries did not result in points merely a 'try' at scoring a goal and Scotland won the match 1–0.

Decline

However, as Allan Massie notes, because it was a boarding school, unlike some of the other private schools in Edinburgh, a lot of the former pupils would disperse and go out of the city. Those that remained in the city would often play for Edinburgh Wanderers.

Revival

In 2013, the Merchistonian Club (the School's former pupil society) revived the rugby team under the name Merchistonian Rugby Football Club (Merchistonian RFC). The side played its first match against traditional rival Edinburgh Academical FC with both sides fielding a strictly former pupil team (rather than Accies open first XV) at Raeburn Place on 29 March, losing 31–20.  The intent is to play this fixture on an annual basis.  

Merchistonian RFC also competed in a number of sevens competitions and the Edinburgh 10s in 2014.

Status

In 2017, the Scottish Rugby Union board granted the Merchistonian RFC its historic status of being a Football Club (FC) instead of a Rugby Football Club (RFC). Historically rugby clubs were also known as football clubs so once again the rugby club is named the Merchistonian Football Club (MFC).

Notable players

Scotland internationalists

The following former Merchiston F.C. players have represented Scotland at full international level.

Edinburgh District

The following former Merchiston F.C. players have represented Edinburgh District at provincial level.

British and Irish Lions

The following former Merchiston F.C. players have represented the British and Irish Lions.

See also
 Fettesian-Lorettonian Club

References

Rugby union in Edinburgh
Sports teams in Edinburgh